Mira is a 1971 Dutch-Belgian drama film directed by Fons Rademakers, based on the novel De Teleurgang van den Waterhoek by Stijn Streuvels. It was entered into the 1971 Cannes Film Festival. The film was selected as the Dutch entry for the Best Foreign Language Film at the 44th Academy Awards, but was not accepted as a nominee. The film was one of the highest-grossing Dutch films of 1971 with a gross of $1.3 million from Belgium and the Netherlands.

Cast
 Willeke van Ammelrooy as Mira
 Jan Decleir as Lander
 Carlos van Lanckere as deken Broeke
 Luc Ponette as Maurice Rondeau
 Roger Bolders as Sieper
 Mart Gevers as Manse
 Freek de Jonge as Treute
 Charles Janssens as Snoek
 Josephine van Gasteren as Moeder van Maurice
 Fons Rademakers as Notaris
 Romain DeConinck as Landmeter
 Ann Petersen as Hospita
 Ward de Ravet as Rijkswachter
 Jo Gevers
 Bert André (as Marc André)
 André van den Heuvel

See also
 List of submissions to the 44th Academy Awards for Best Foreign Language Film
 List of Dutch submissions for the Academy Award for Best Foreign Language Film

References

External links

1971 films
1971 drama films
Dutch drama films
Belgian drama films
1970s Dutch-language films
Films based on Belgian novels
Films directed by Fons Rademakers
Films scored by Georges Delerue